2003 Baghdad bombings include: 

Jordanian embassy bombing in Baghdad, on August 7
Canal Hotel bombing, on August 19
27 October 2003 Baghdad bombings